The SPFL Development League was the top level of youth football in Scotland, which was contested in various formats between 1998 and 2018.

History
A youth league was founded as the Scottish Premier under-18 League in 1998. Clubs fielded under-18 teams, with the Scottish Premier Reserve League originally being an under-21 league. The competition was changed in 2003 when it became the Scottish Premier under-19 League. The teams played 22 matches rather than 30.

For the 2012–13 season, the competition changed again, this time to the Scottish Premier under-20 league, there were 15 teams, and teams played 28 matches per season. With the inception of the Scottish Professional Football League for the 2013–14 season, the league become the SPFL U20 League and the number of teams increased to 16. Teams were allowed to field two over-age outfield players and an overage goalkeeper.

The league was renamed the SPFL Development League in 2014, with the number of teams increased to 17. At this time two regional leagues were also introduced, with eight clubs competing in the Development League West and nine clubs competing in the Development League East. The restriction on over-age players was relaxed, with teams now permitted to use five older players in a matchday squad of 18.

The league was dissolved in 2018 and replaced by the SPFL Reserve Leagues.

European competition
From 2015 onwards, the UEFA Youth League provides a qualification route for 'domestic youth champions', in addition to clubs whose senior team reaches the UEFA Champions League group stage. As the age group for the Development League is older than that of the UEFA Group League, Scotland's representative will be the winner of the Under-17 league, which plays competitive fixtures however does not reveal the results and tables publicly to minimise the scrutiny on the young players. In 2015, 2016, and 2017, the winners of the Under-17 league were Celtic; in 2018, Hamilton won the title, and Rangers were the 2019 champions.

Winners

SFL Youth League

SPL Under-18 League

SPL Under-19 League

SPFL Under-20 League

SPFL Development League

Other Competitions (SFL / SPFL era) 

Although the Scottish Premier League (SPL) superseded the Scottish Football League (SFL) as the top division in 1998, the SFL continued to run an under-18 league until 2003, when the age group was split into under-17's and under-19's. The SFL also ran a cup competition (not to be confused with the SFA Youth Cup) for the various age groups. After the SFL ceased operation in 2013, with the foundation of the Scottish Professional Football League (SPFL) in 2013, an under-19 league and cup competition was run alongside the new under-20 league. There were also West and East Development Divisions operating under the main SPFL Development League between 2014 and 2018. Club Academy Scotland (CAS), organised and managed by the Scottish Football Association (SFA), began operating youth leagues with under-17 the top age group in 2014. The under-17 age range was raised to under-18 by CAS in 2018.

References

External links
 League fixtures

 
Scottish Premier League
Development league
1998 establishments in Scotland
Sports leagues established in 1998
Youth football in Scotland
2018 disestablishments in Scotland
Sports leagues disestablished in 2018
Defunct football leagues in Scotland